Felino A. Palafox, Jr. is a Filipino architect, urban planner. He is the Principal Architect-Urban Planner and Founder of Palafox Associates.

Aside from his duties in his architectural firm, he also serves as a member of the board of directors in Asian Terminals, Inc. from 2009 to present, chaired professional and civic organisations such as PIEP, MAP and Rotary Club of Manila.

Personal life
Palafox received a classical secondary education from Christ the King seminary when he was 13. He obtained his bachelor's degree in Architecture from University of Santo Tomas in 1972 and two years later, in 1974, he obtained his master's degree in Environmental Planning at the UP Diliman through a scholarship grant by United Nations Development Program (UNDP).

In 2003, he graduated in Advanced Management Development Program for Real Estate at the Harvard University.

Career
In 1977 he started working as Senior Architect and Planner for the government of Dubai. During also that time, he met Henry Sy who later became one of his clients. Sy encouraged him to return to the country. Palafox worked for the Dubai municipality until 1981.

Awards
Palafox Associates is the first Filipino architectural firm cited in the World's Top 500 Architectural Firms of the World Architecture Magazine. In 2006, the firm ranked 94th – holding the distinction of being the only Southeast Asian firm in the list. In 2012, Palafox Associates places 89th in the world-ranking dominated by American, European, Japanese, Australian and Chinese firms; and Top 8 in the Leisure Market sector

References

Living people
University of Santo Tomas alumni
1950 births
Filipino architects
People from Ilocos Norte
University of the Philippines Diliman alumni